Jinyeong Station is a railway station in South Korea. It is on the Gyeongjeon Line.

External links
 Cyber station information from Korail

Railway stations in North Gyeongsang Province
Gimhae
Railway stations in Korea opened in 1905
Korea Train Express stations